Prehistoric Predators was a 2007 National Geographic Channel program based on different predators that lived in the Cenozoic era, including Smilodon and C. megalodon. The series investigated how such beasts hunted and fought other creatures, and what drove them to extinction.

Featured animals
Pleistocene: 1.8 million-10,000 years ago
North America:
Smilodon fatalis, dire wolf, short-faced bear, American lion, Bison antiquus, Mexican horse, Columbian mammoth, Megalonyx, gray wolf (cameo), grizzly bear (cameo), early humans

Miocene-Pliocene: 15-3 million years ago
South America, North America:
Kelenken, Parapropalaehoplophorus, Homalodotherium, Titanis, Canis edwardii, Smilodon gracilis, Hipparion

Miocene-Pleistocene: 20-2 million years ago
The Atlantic:
C. megalodon, Cetotherium, Squalodon, dugong, great white shark (cameo), green sea turtle (cameo)

Oligocene-Miocene: 32-19 million years ago
North America:
Archaeotherium, Hyaenodon, Dinictis, Mesohippus, Poebrotherium, Subhyracodon, Moropus, Merycoidodon, Daeodon, Amphicyon

Episodes

Related series
When Dinosaurs Roamed America
Monsters Resurrected

References

External links
 

National Geographic (American TV channel) original programming
Documentary films about prehistoric life